The Poë, later Poë-Domvile Baronetcy, of Heywood in the Parish of Ballinakill in Queen's County, was a title in the Baronetage of the United Kingdom. It was created on 2 July 1912 for Hutcheson Poë, subsequently Lord Lieutenant of Queen's County (1920–22) and a Senator of the Irish Free State (1922–24). He married Mary Adelaide, only surviving daughter of Sir William Compton Domvile, 3rd Baronet (see Domvile Baronets). Through this marriage Heywood House came into the Poë family.

Hugo Compton Domvile Poë, only son of the first baronet, was declared of unsound mind on 10 May 1929. On his father's death, he inherited the baronetcy. On his mother's death, he became eligible to inherit lands in Dublin, on condition that he adopt the surname and arms of Domvile. As there were doubts about whether this could be done for a person of unsound mind, a private act of the Oireachtas was passed on 3 April 1936 to change his name to Hugo Compton Domvile Poë Domvile and his arms to quartering of the Poë and Domvile arms.

The baronetcy became extinct on Hugo's death in 1959.

Poë, later Poë-Domvile Baronets, of Heywood (1912)
 Sir (William) Hutcheson Poë, 1st Baronet (1848 – 30 November 1934)
 Sir Hugo Compton Domvile Domvile-Poë, 2nd Baronet (1889–1959)

References

Extinct baronetcies in the Baronetage of the United Kingdom